Euxoa aequalis is a moth of the family Noctuidae first described by Leon F. Harvey in 1876. It is found in Canada from British Columbia, Alberta, Saskatchewan and Yukon, south into the United States, where it has been recorded from Colorado, Wyoming and California.

The wingspan is about 33 mm.

Subspecies
Euxoa aequalis aequalis (Harvey, 1876)
Euxoa aequalis acornis (Smith, 1895)
Euxoa aequalis alko (Strecker, 1899)
Euxoa yukonensis Lafontaine, 1987

External links

Euxoa
Moths of North America
Moths described in 1876

Taxa named by Leon F. Harvey